Ramon Ricardo da Rocha (born 19 March 2001), known as Ramon Rocha, is a Brazilian footballer who plays as a right back.

Club career
Born in Baixo Guandu, Espírito Santo, Ramon Rocha joined Palmeiras' youth setup in 2016. He was also an unused substitute in a 2–2 Série A away draw against Santos on 6 December 2020.

Ramon Rocha left Palmeiras on 11 March 2021, and joined Cruzeiro. After playing exclusively for the under-20 side of the club during the 2021 season, he suffered a knee injury in October of that year.

On 8 December 2022, after a short period at Novorizontino (where he did not play), Ramon Rocha signed for Portuguesa for the 2023 Campeonato Paulista. He made his senior debut on 26 January 2023, replacing Pará late into a 4–1 away loss against São Paulo.

On 9 February 2023, Ramon left Lusa on a mutual agreement.

Career statistics

Honours
Palmeiras
Copa Libertadores: 2020

References

2001 births
Living people
Sportspeople from Espírito Santo
Brazilian footballers
Association football defenders
Associação Portuguesa de Desportos players